Elie Fahed (born May 8, 1989) is a Lebanese film director.

Born in Zaytoun (Lebanon) on May 8, 1989.

He studied film making at the Lebanese University – Fine Arts Institute. During his second year of studies, his personal short film “Ma Yenaad Aaleik” ("Happy Birthday" in English) was selected for the Beirut International Film Festival 2011.

“Starring Julia” ("Men Boutoulet Julia" in Arabic) is his bachelor's degree short film which tells the story of Julia, a 70-year-old lady who decides to pursue her lifetime dream of being an actress. “Starring Julia” has been shown at film festivals around the world including the Baghdad Film Festival, MENAR Film Festival  The 5th edition of FICMEC Outbox Film Festival(Page 3)  NDU Student Film Festival (Page 19) "Starring Julia" won the Orbit Prize at the Beirut International Film Festival 2012 and “Best Student Short Film” award in Monaco at the MCFF 2013.

In 2013, Fahed participated in Jamming With The Light,  a cinematography workshop for directors and cinematographers conducted by Muriel AboulRouss, which resulted in a 28-minute short film entitled Impulse inspired by Dialogues by Jacques Salome. Fahed's contribution to Impulse was entitled Habibi, a black and white film describing the struggle of a married woman who can't decide whether to stay or leave her husband.

In 2015, Elie Fahed released on YouTube a two-minute film called "Things I Love".

In a recent interview with StepFeed, Elie explains the inspiration behind his latest project that it was rather simple: 
“I was driving and the yellow light turned red, it felt so good crossing at the very last second, so I decided to put this moment somewhere, the next morning I had a Man'ouche and I was like, ‘this very simple culinary invention can make your day better, and throughout the days I discovered that there’re so many cool and fun moments that we should share with the world, and I decided to film this.”

At less than 3 minutes, the film quickly highlights all of the small things that make Fahed happy and appreciate life. From London’s foggy weather, to Instagram to Fahed’s favorite directors, the brief vignette into Fahed’s favorite things makes the viewer remember to appreciate the mundane moments and simple joys of life.

In 2017, according to Italian website Good Short Films "Life In 2 Minutes" was chosen as one of best 10 short films that are available online in 2017.

In April 2019, Elie Fahed was a jury member at the Beirut International Film Festival.

In September 2019, Elie released his 4th personal short film, entitled "The Fear Of Fear" which was screened at the GQ Portugal Men Of the Year in November 2019, in Lisbon, Portugal, "The Fear Of Fear" discusses the importance of fear in our lives, how it can take us places, yet it can keep us where we are as well, in a black white 3 minutes film.

In the year of 2021, Elie's fifth personal short film "Sett el Donia", got selected in Interfilm Short Film Festival in Berlin, in its 36th edition.
This short film starring Carmen Bsaibes and Elie Fahed is a tribute to Beirut.

References

External links
 

1989 births
Living people
Lebanese film directors